Norsminde Fjord is an inlet on the east coast of peninsular Denmark at the village of Norsminde, some 20 km south of Aarhus.

The south section of Norsminde Fjord has been drained and is today coastal meadows, marsh or wetlands with rushes, mainly used for grazing animals. It is these wetlands in the south of the fjord that is known as Kysing Fjord which is Natura 2000 site (no. 59) and European Union Special Protection Areas bird sanctuary (no. 30). The bird sanctuary has a special focus on the whooper swan but other rare birds also nest in the area.

History 
Norsminde Fjord is an East Jutland Fjord, a glacial moraine valley, created during the Weichselian glaciation c. 20,000 to 70,000 years ago. The stream Rævs Å flows into the fjord and over time it has suffered silting and become increasingly shallow. In 1832 the southern part of the Fjord was drained and made into farmland or wet meadows for animal grazing. In 1942 the remaining fjord and surrounding meadows were designated a wilderness preserve. However, the drained lands proved fertile and a good investment so in the 1950s it was attempted to drain the rest of the fjord. The draining effort failed and instead a sluice was installed to control water levels and flooding. The areas that were drained is today known as Kysing Fjord,  of drained wetlands consisting mostly of wet and coastal meadows. The area has suffered damage from fertilizer runoff and wastewater from Odder and Malling over the years causing issues with algae blooms that displace vegetation and animals. Kysing Fjord is today a natural preserve.

Nature preserve 
Many species of birds are found at the fjord and the inner wetlands but the nature preservation has a special focus on the whooper swan. It is a migratory bird which eats underwater vegetation and forages on wintergreen meadows. During mild winters the whooper swan stays in the area from April to November and the flocks here has been recorded to reach some 12,000 birds. The number of swans wintering in the area has risen over the years, possibly as a result of milder winters or maybe an enlarged area suitable for foraging. In and around the fjord the most common species of birds are eurasian coot, northern lapwing, eurasian wigeon, mallard, golden plover, tufted duck, eurasian teal, mute swan, a number of waders and, during cold winters, the common merganser. White-tailed eagle and peregrine falcons also have a presence in the area, both very rare and endangered birds in Denmark. The dominant species at Norsminde Fjord are dabbling ducks, a result of the large number of surface algae caused by previous years nutrient pollution from poor wastewater management and fertilizer runoff.

Gallery

References

External links 

Fjords of Denmark
Aarhus Municipality
Odder Municipality
Natura 2000 in Denmark
Special Protection Areas